Courage is an album by the Brazilian singer-songwriter and guitarist Milton Nascimento, recorded in 1968 and released on the CTI label.

Reception

AllMusic called the album "a masterpiece, a gorgeously executed tour through his early songs... To some admirers, Courage remains his best record, period".

Track listing
All compositions by Milton Nascimento except where noted
 "Bridges (Travessia)" (Nascimento, Fernando Brant, Gene Lees) - 3:52 
 "Vera Cruz" - 3:12 
 "Tres Pontas" - 2:45 
 "Outubro (October)" (Brant, Nascimento) - 4:12 
 "Courage" (Nascimento, Paul Williams) - 3:25 
 "Rio Vermelho" (Danilo Caymmi, Nascimento) - 3:23 
 "Gira Girou (Round and Round)" - 3:26 
 "Morro Velho" - 4:28 
 "Catavento" - 2:31 
 "Canção do Sal" - 3:07
Recorded at Van Gelder Studio in Englewood Cliffs, New Jersey, on December 19, 1968 (tracks 1, 3, 4 & 8), February 26 (tracks 2, 6, 7 & 10) and February 27 (tracks 5, 8 & 9), 1969

Personnel
Milton Nascimento - vocals and guitar
Wayne Andre, Paul Faulise, John Messner, Tony Studd, Bill Watrous, Chauncey Welsch - trombone
Burt Collins, Marvin Stamm - flugelhorn
Ray Alonge, Joe DeAngelis, Paul Ingraham - French horn
George Marge - clarinet
Danny Bank, Harvey Estrin, Hubert Laws, Romeo Penque, Jerome Richardson, Bill Slapin, Joe Soldo - flute
Herbie Hancock - piano
Eumir Deodato - organ, arranger, conductor
Jose Marino - bass
João Palma - drums
Airto Moreira - percussion
David Nadien, Anahid Ajemian, Frederick Buldrini, Alexander Cores, Harry Cykman, Lewis Eley, Harry Glickman, Emanuel Green, Raoul Poliakin, Max Pollikoff, Matthew Raimondi, Joyce Robbins, Tosha Samaroff, Avram Weiss, Jack Zatde, Joseph Zwilich - violin
Alfred Brown, Harold Coletta, Theodore Israel, David Mankovitz, Emanuel Vardi - viola
Charles McCracken, George Ricci, Lucien Schmit, Alan Shulman - cello
Anamaria Valle - vocal
Technical
Pete Turner - photography

References

CTI Records albums
Milton Nascimento albums
1969 albums
Albums produced by Creed Taylor
Albums arranged by Eumir Deodato
Albums recorded at Van Gelder Studio